Arijan Ademi (born 29 May 1991) is a professional footballer who captains Prva HNL side Dinamo Zagreb and plays for the North Macedonia national team.

Ademi started his professional career at Šibenik, debuting for the senior squad on 22 March 2008, aged just 16 years. On 16 June 2010, he was transferred to reigning Croatian champions Dinamo Zagreb. Through ten seasons at the club, Ademi became the most decorated player in club's history, having won 19 trophies.

Born in Croatia to  Albanian parents, Ademi represented his country of birth at various youth levels. Despite even making three appearances for the senior team, on 9 October 2014, he debuted for the Macedonia national team in an official match. He was selected to represent North Macedonia at UEFA Euro 2020.

In 2015, Ademi initially received a four-year suspension for doping, which was subsequently reduced to two years.

Club career

Šibenik
Ademi began his career at Šibenik where he was promoted to the first team on 15 September 2007. He made his first senior appearance for the club on 22 March 2008 in a match against Dinamo Zagreb. He featured as a 63rd-minute substitute for Gabriel in a match Šibenik lost 5–1. The following season Ademi made 28 appearances for the senior squad, 16 of which he started in the first eleven. The 2009–10 Prva HNL was the most successful for Ademi as he made 27 appearances in the first eleven and scored two goals. He scored his first league goal on 25 July 2009 in an away match against Croatia Sesvete which Šibenik won 2–1. He was also the youngest player that captained any Prva HNL club that season.

Dinamo Zagreb
On 16 June 2010 he was transferred to Dinamo Zagreb for a fee of €400,000. He made his first appearance for his new club on 31 July 2010 in a league match against Rijeka in a match Dinamo Zagreb lost 2–1. He also made his debut in European competitions on 4 August in the 2010–11 UEFA Champions League third qualifying round match against Sheriff Tiraspol which finished with a draw 1–1. Upon arrival of the coach Vahid Halilhodžić he established himself as a first team regular in the position of defensive midfielder, and appeared as a starter in their 2010–11 UEFA Europa League group matches, as Dinamo finished third with 7 points, behind Villarreal and PAOK. By the end of the season he has won his first trophies with Dinamo, Prva HNL and Croatian Cup.

After losing his first team spot, in the second part of the 2011–12 season he was sent on loan to Lokomotiva, where he made only three appearances due to injury.

He came back from loan at the beginning of the 2012–13 season, and was a part of the squad that qualified for the 2012–13 UEFA Champions League. In the CL group stage, Ademi made 5 appearances, as Dinamo finished bottom of their group with one point.

On 7 October 2015, Dinamo Zagreb announced that Ademi failed a doping test after their recent Champions League win over Arsenal in September. UEFA subsequently suspended Ademi for a period of four years. On 27 March 2017, the suspension was reduced by two years as Ademi managed to prove that he hadn't taken doping intentionally, making him eligible for selection from October 2017. In November 2017, Ademi was named the club captain, after coach Mario Cvitanović stripped Domagoj Antolić of captaincy.

In summer 2020, upon winning Prva HNL, Ademi became the most decorated player in Dinamo's history, having won 17 trophies. On 3 December 2020, he broke Sammir's record for most appearances for Dinamo in European competitions, making his 77th appearance in the 2–0 Europa League victory over Feyenoord at De Kuip.

Beijing Guoan
In March 2023, it was confirmed that Ademi would be leaving Dinamo after 13 years to join the Chinese Super League team Beijing Guoan. He played his final match for Dinamo on the 19th of March against Rijeka.

International career

Croatia
Ademi made his first international appearance for Croatia playing for the under-19 football team. His debut international cap came in a friendly match against Slovenia under-19 selection in Bistra, on 12 August 2008. Croatia won the match 3–1 and Ademi played until 69th minute when he was substituted by Renato Kelić. He made another appearance the next day when two selections faced each other in Brežice. The match finished with another win by Croatian under-19 team and Ademi played full 90 minutes in that match. He scored his first international goal on 17 September in a friendly match against Bosnia and Herzegovina under-19 team in Županja. The match finished with a 2–2 draw.

His first official match for under-19 team came on 5 October 2008 when the team faced Estonia in Tallinn in their 2009 UEFA under-19 football championship. Estonia won the match 4–1 with Ademi playing the full match for Croatian side. He made another appearance against Kazakhstan on 7 October 2008 in a match Croatia won 4–0.

After that, Ademi was capped four times in friendly matches for the under-18 team between 10 March and 2 April 2009. He also scored a goal against Bosnia and Herzegovina under-18 team on 31 March in a home match Croatia won 3–0. Ademi returned to under-19 team on 15 September 2009 featuring in the friendly match against Slovenia. After that, he made four more official appearances for the under-19 team in their 2010 UEFA under-19 football championship qualifying campaign.

On 22 January 2013 national team head coach Igor Štimac called up Ademi for a friendly match against South Korea in London on 6 February 2013. Earlier, in February 2013, Ademi had complained to the Albanian media that Albania never extended him an invitation.

North Macedonia
After Ademi was not picked for the 2014 FIFA World Cup squad in Brazil by coach Niko Kovač, he decided to play for Macedonia. Kovač later changed his mind and tried to call him up after the tournament but Ademi refused as he had already given his word to the Football Federation of Macedonia and didn't want to break the besa. On 9 October 2014 he made his official debut in a UEFA Euro 2016 qualifying match against Luxembourg.

On 8 October and 12 November 2020, Ademi took part in North Macedonia's 2–1 and 1–0 victories over Kosovo and Georgia in the UEFA Euro 2020 play-offs, despite being injured both times, helping North Macedonia reach their first major tournament in history. On 31 March 2021, in the 2022 FIFA World Cup qualifier against Germany in Duisburg, Ademi provided Eljif Elmas with an assist for the winning goal in the 2–1 victory. It was Germany's first defeat in the FIFA World Cup qualification since 1 September 2001 and the third ever.

Personal life
Ademi was born in Šibenik to a Macedonian Albanian family who hail from Pirok. His great-grandfather moved from Pirok to Šibenik after World War I, where his grandfather Afet opened a pastry shop that is still working. He is a cousin of Macedonian professional football player Agim Ibraimi.

In April 2020, Ademi's girlfriend Andrea Janković, daughter of Janko Janković, gave birth in Zagreb to their first child, a baby boy they named Adrian.

Career statistics

Club

International

International goals
North Macedonia score listed first, score column indicates score after each Ademi goal.

Honours

Club
Šibenik
Croatian Cup runner-up: 2009–10

Dinamo Zagreb
Prva HNL : 2010–11, 2011–12, 2012–13, 2013–14, 2014–15, 2015–16, 2017–18, 2018–19, 2019–20, 2020–21, 2021-22
Croatian Cup : 2010–11, 2011–12, 2014–15, 2015–16, 2017–18, 2020–21
Croatian Super Cup: 2010, 2013, 2019, 2022

Individual
UEFA European Under-19 Championship Team of the Tournament: 2010
Football Oscar Team of the Year: 2015, 2018, 2020, 2021, 2022
Tportal Croatian First League Player of the Year: 2020 
24 sata (Croatia) Team of the Season: 2020-21 
GNK Dinamo Zagreb Player of the Half-Season: 2021-22
Večernji list : 10th greatest Croatian Footballer in last 50 years

References

External links

Profile at Macedonian Football 

1991 births
Living people
Sportspeople from Šibenik
Croatian people of Albanian descent
Croatian people of Macedonian descent
Association football midfielders
Croatian footballers
Croatia youth international footballers
Croatia under-21 international footballers
Croatia international footballers
Macedonian footballers
North Macedonia international footballers
Dual internationalists (football)
HNK Šibenik players
GNK Dinamo Zagreb players
NK Lokomotiva Zagreb players
Croatian Football League players
UEFA Euro 2020 players
Doping cases in association football
Croatian sportspeople in doping cases
Macedonian sportspeople in doping cases
Albanian footballers from North Macedonia